Arundineae is a tribe of grasses, containing four genera.

It is not to be confused with the bamboo tribe Arundinarieae and the panicoid tribe Arundinelleae.

References

Arundinoideae
Poaceae tribes